The fourth season of The Fairly OddParents began on November 7, 2003. The second movie, "Channel Chasers", aired in the summer of 2004, and for the 4th time, 2 Nicktoons make crossovers in The Jimmy Timmy Power Hour. The season officially ended with "School's Out!: The Musical" on June 10, 2005. It was produced by Frederator Studios and Nickelodeon Animation Studio.

Episodes

DVD releases

References

 

2004 American television seasons
2005 American television seasons
The Fairly OddParents seasons